Scopula nigricornis is a moth of the  family Geometridae. It is found in South Africa.

References

Moths described in 1992
nigricornis
Moths of Africa